Streptococcus infantarius is a species of bacteria.

Natural genetic transformation

S. infantarius is competent for natural genetic transformation.   Competence can be induced in cultures at high cell density, and is transient.

References

Further reading

External links

LPSN
Type strain of Streptococcus infantarius at BacDive -  the Bacterial Diversity Metadatabase

Streptococcaceae
Bacteria described in 2000